Antonio Deleon "Dell" McGee (born September 7, 1973) is an American football coach at the University of Georgia. He served as an interim head football coach at Georgia Southern University in 2015. McGee played for the Arizona Cardinals of the National Football League (NFL) in 1998.

In 2013, McGee was an analyst for the Auburn Tigers football team.  He was part of the Bulldogs' coaching staff that won the National Championship over Alabama in the 2021 season. The following year, he won another title when Georgia defeated TCU in the National Championship.

Head coaching record

 † Served as interim HC for bowl game

References

External links
 Georgia Bulldogs bio
 
 The Football Database profile

1973 births
Living people
Sportspeople from Columbus, Georgia
Players of American football from Columbus, Georgia
Auburn Tigers football players
Arizona Cardinals players
Rhein Fire players
Detroit Lions players
Carolina Cobras players
Los Angeles Xtreme players
Nashville Kats players
High school football coaches in Georgia (U.S. state)
Georgia Southern Eagles football coaches
Georgia Bulldogs football coaches